The 1976 Philadelphia Phillies season was the 94th season in the history of the franchise. The Phillies won their first postseason berth since 1950 and their first National League East title, as they compiled a record of 101–61, nine games ahead of the second-place Pittsburgh Pirates, and won 100 games or more for the first time in franchise history.

The Phillies lost the NLCS, 3–0 to the Cincinnati Reds.  Danny Ozark managed the Phillies in his fourth year, as they played their home games at Veterans Stadium, where the All-Star Game was played that season.

Offseason 
 October 24, 1975: Larry Cox was traded by the Phillies to the Minnesota Twins for Sergio Ferrer.
 December 10, 1975: Dick Ruthven, Roy Thomas, and Alan Bannister were traded by the Phillies to the Chicago White Sox for Jim Kaat and Mike Buskey.
 December 27, 1975: Luis Aguayo was signed by the Phillies as an amateur free agent.
 January 7, 1976: Derek Botelho was drafted by the Phillies in the 2nd round of the 1976 Major League Baseball draft. Player signed May 5, 1976.

Regular season 
The final 9-game margin masks how competitive the season actually was. In a scary echo of 1964, the Phillies saw a -game August lead dwindle to just 3 games as their offense dried up on two late-year road trips.

Mike Schmidt hit 12 home runs in Philadelphia's first 15 games, including four in one game on April 17. No one had hit this many home runs so quickly. In that game, the Phillies and Chicago Cubs combined for thirty-four runs in a game which featured nine home runs. Schmidt's home run feat was later tied by Alex Rodriguez in 2007.

Schmidt also won his first of 10 Gold Gloves that year, and carried the Phillies to the 1976 NLCS where he hit .308.
The Phillies hit a major league-leading seven grand slams.

Season standings

Record vs. opponents

Notable transactions 
 April 9, 1976: Wayne Nordhagen was purchased by the Phillies from the St. Louis Cardinals.
 May 14, 1976: Bobby Brown was signed as a free agent by the Phillies.
 July 14, 1976: Wayne Nordhagen was traded by the Phillies to the Chicago White Sox for Rich Coggins.

Draft picks 
 June 8, 1976: Joe Charboneau was drafted by the Phillies in the 2nd round of the secondary phase of the 1976 Major League Baseball draft. Player signed June 10, 1976.

Game log

|- style="background:#fbb"
| 1 || April 10 || Pirates || 4–5 (11) || Larry Demery (1–0) || Tug McGraw (0–1) || None || 42,147 || 0–1
|- style="background:#fbb"
| 2 || April 11 || Pirates || 3–8 || Bruce Kison (1–0) || Steve Carlton (0–1) || Bob Moose (1) || 18,373 || 0–2
|- style="background:#bfb"
| 3 || April 14 || @ Expos || 8–2 || Jim Lonborg (1–0) || Steve Rogers (0–2) || None || 21,199 || 1–2
|- style="background:#fbb"
| 4 || April 15 || @ Expos || 5–8 || Woodie Fryman (1–1) || Jim Kaat (0–1) || Wayne Granger (1) || 6,375 || 1–3
|- style="background:#bfb"
| 5 || April 17 || @ Cubs || 18–16 (10) || Tug McGraw (1–1) || Darold Knowles (1–1) || Jim Lonborg (1) || 28,287 || 2–3
|- style="background:#bfb"
| 6 || April 18 || @ Cubs || 8–5 || Larry Christenson (1–0) || Ray Burris (0–2) || Gene Garber (1) || 13,326 || 3–3
|- style="background:#bfb"
| 7 || April 20 || @ Pirates || 5–1 || Jim Kaat (1–1) || John Candelaria (0–1) || None || 8,800 || 4–3
|- style="background:#bfb"
| 8 || April 21 || @ Pirates || 3–0 || Tom Underwood (1–0) || Doc Medich (1–1) || Tug McGraw (1) || 9,175 || 5–3
|- style="background:#fbb"
| 9 || April 23 || Braves || 5–6 || Bruce Dal Canton (1–0) || Tug McGraw (1–2) || Elías Sosa (1) || 29,398 || 5–4
|- style="background:#bfb"
| 10 || April 24 || Braves || 10–5 || Ron Reed (1–0) || Elías Sosa (1–2) || None || 25,477 || 6–4
|- style="background:#fbb"
| 11 || April 25 || Braves || 2–3 || Phil Niekro (3–0) || Larry Christenson (1–1) || Elías Sosa (2) || 10,565 || 6–5
|- style="background:#bfb"
| 12 || April 26 || Reds || 10–9 || Tug McGraw (2–2) || Rawly Eastwick (1–1) || None || 16,565 || 7–5
|- style="background:#fbb"
| 13 || April 27 || Reds || 3–7 || Jack Billingham (2–2) || Tom Underwood (1–1) || None || 17,818 || 7–6
|- style="background:#bfb"
| 14 || April 28 || Reds || 7–6 || Jim Lonborg (2–0) || Pat Darcy (1–2) || Tug McGraw (2) || 20,215 || 8–6
|- style="background:#bbb"
| – || April 30 || @ Braves || colspan=6 | Postponed (rain); Makeup: May 1 as a traditional double-header
|-

|- style="background:#bfb"
| 15 || May 1 (1) || @ Braves || 3–0 || Larry Christenson (2–1) || Dick Ruthven (3–2) || Tug McGraw (3) || see 2nd game || 9–6
|- style="background:#bfb"
| 16 || May 1 (2) || @ Braves || 4–2 || Steve Carlton (1–1) || Carl Morton (0–3) || None || 24,189 || 10–6
|- style="background:#bfb"
| 17 || May 2 || @ Braves || 8–2 || Jim Kaat (2–1) || Andy Messersmith (0–2) || Gene Garber (2) || 20,479 || 11–6
|- style="background:#bfb"
| 18 || May 4 || Astros || 5–0 || Jim Lonborg (3–0) || Larry Dierker (3–3) || None || 10,655 || 12–6
|- style="background:#bfb"
| 19 || May 5 || Astros || 6–3 || Ron Reed (2–0) || Joe Niekro (1–5) || Gene Garber (3) || 17,944 || 13–6
|- style="background:#fbb"
| 20 || May 7 || Dodgers || 8–10 || Charlie Hough (2–0) || Ron Reed (2–1) || Mike Marshall (6) || 28,862 || 13–7
|- style="background:#bfb"
| 21 || May 8 || Dodgers || 6–4 || Gene Garber (1–0) || Tommy John (1–2) || None || 34,060 || 14–7
|- style="background:#bfb"
| 22 || May 9 || Dodgers || 10–3 || Jim Lonborg (4–0) || Doug Rau (4–1) || None || 24,143 || 15–7
|- style="background:#bfb"
| 23 || May 11 || Padres || 9–1 || Steve Carlton (2–1) || Dan Spillner (1–5) || None || 11,576 || 16–7
|- style="background:#fbb"
| 24 || May 12 || Padres || 0–4 || Randy Jones (6–2) || Jim Kaat (2–2) || None || 20,043 || 16–8
|- style="background:#bfb"
| 25 || May 14 || @ Astros || 5–1 || Larry Christenson (3–1) || Mike Cosgrove (1–2) || None || 14,264 || 17–8
|- style="background:#bfb"
| 26 || May 15 || @ Astros || 2–1 || Jim Lonborg (5–0) || Larry Dierker (4–4) || None || 20,749 || 18–8
|- style="background:#bfb"
| 27 || May 16 || @ Astros || 12–2 || Steve Carlton (3–1) || Tom Griffin (2–1) || None || 11,553 || 19–8
|- style="background:#bbb"
| – || May 18 || @ Mets || colspan=6 | Postponed (rain); Makeup: August 1 as a traditional double-header
|- style="background:#bfb"
| 28 || May 19 || @ Mets || 2–1 || Larry Christenson (4–1) || Mickey Lolich (2–5) || Tom Underwood (1) || 12,836 || 20–8
|- style="background:#bfb"
| 29 || May 20 || @ Mets || 5–3 || Jim Lonborg (6–0) || Tom Seaver (4–3) || Tug McGraw (4) || 16,914 || 21–8
|- style="background:#bfb"
| 30 || May 21 || Cardinals || 2–1 || Steve Carlton (4–1) || Pete Falcone (2–3) || None || 32,074 || 22–8
|- style="background:#fbb"
| 31 || May 22 || Cardinals || 6–7 || Al Hrabosky (1–3) || Tug McGraw (2–3) || None || 39,098 || 22–9
|- style="background:#bfb"
| 32 || May 23 || Cardinals || 3–2 (11) || Tug McGraw (3–3) || Al Hrabosky (1–4) || None || 37,537 || 23–9
|- style="background:#bfb"
| 33 || May 24 || Mets || 7–1 || Larry Christenson (5–1) || Mickey Lolich (2–6) || None || 21,899 || 24–9
|- style="background:#bfb"
| 34 || May 25 || Mets || 8–4 || Jim Lonborg (7–0) || Tom Seaver (4–4) || None || 32,772 || 25–9
|- style="background:#bfb"
| 35 || May 25 || Mets || 5–0 || Steve Carlton (5–1) || Jon Matlack (4–1) || None || 28,306 || 26–9
|- style="background:#fbb"
| 36 || May 27 || Mets || 2–5 || Jerry Koosman (6–1) || Gene Garber (1–1) || Skip Lockwood (7) || 29,525 || 26–10
|- style="background:#bfb"
| 37 || May 28 || Expos || 10–3 || Ron Reed (3–1) || Don Stanhouse (2–1) || None || 23,011 || 27–10
|- style="background:#bfb"
| 38 || May 29 || Expos || 6–1 || Larry Christenson (6–1) || Don Carrithers (1–3) || Gene Garber (4) || 18,063 || 28–10
|- style="background:#bfb"
| 39 || May 30 || Expos || 7–1 || Jim Lonborg (8–0) || Clay Kirby (0–3) || None || 27,090 || 29–10
|- style="background:#fbb"
| 40 || May 31 (1) || Cubs || 5–7 || Rick Reuschel (5–3) || Steve Carlton (5–2) || Bruce Sutter (2) || see 2nd game || 29–11
|- style="background:#bfb"
| 41 || May 31 (2) || Cubs || 4–1 || Jim Kaat (3–2) || Mike Garman (2–4) || None || 51,211 || 30–11
|-

|- style="background:#bfb"
| 42 || June 1 || Cubs || 6–1 (6) || Ron Reed (4–1) || Steve Renko (1–2) || None || 26,846 || 31–11
|- style="background:#bfb"
| 43 || June 2 || @ Cardinals || 4–1 || Tom Underwood (2–1) || John Curtis (3–5) || None || 16,850 || 32–11
|- style="background:#fbb"
| 44 || June 3 || @ Cardinals || 1–7 || Bob Forsch (1–1) || Larry Christenson (6–2) || None || 15,832 || 32–12
|- style="background:#fbb"
| 45 || June 4 || @ Giants || 1–5 || Jim Barr (3–4) || Jim Lonborg (8–1) || None || 7,374 || 32–13
|- style="background:#fbb"
| 46 || June 5 || @ Giants || 2–4 || Ed Halicki (4–8) || Steve Carlton (5–3) || Randy Moffitt (2) || 9,439 || 32–14
|- style="background:#bfb"
| 47 || June 6 || @ Giants || 9–3 || Jim Kaat (4–2) || John Montefusco (6–5) || None || 30,218 || 33–14
|- style="background:#bfb"
| 48 || June 7 || @ Dodgers || 8–6 || Ron Reed (5–1) || Charlie Hough (7–1) || Gene Garber (5) || 30,627 || 34–14
|- style="background:#bfb"
| 49 || June 8 || @ Dodgers || 14–2 || Larry Christenson (7–2) || Tommy John (2–4) || None || 27,950 || 35–14
|- style="background:#fbb"
| 50 || June 9 || @ Dodgers || 2–3 || Burt Hooton (5–5) || Jim Lonborg (8–2) || Charlie Hough (2) || 27,794 || 35–15
|- style="background:#bfb"
| 51 || June 10 || @ Dodgers || 10–6 (12) || Tug McGraw (4–3) || Stan Wall (1–2) || Ron Schueler (1) || 27,052 || 36–15
|- style="background:#bfb"
| 52 || June 11 || @ Padres || 4–2 || Jim Kaat (5–2) || Alan Foster (1–3) || Tom Underwood (2) || 15,754 || 37–15
|- style="background:#bfb"
| 53 || June 12 || @ Padres || 3–2 (15) || Tom Underwood (3–1) || Ken Reynolds (0–2) || Ron Schueler (2) || 24,515 || 38–15
|- style="background:#fbb"
| 54 || June 13 (1) || @ Padres || 0–5 || Randy Jones (12–2) || Jim Lonborg (8–3) || None || see 2nd game || 38–16
|- style="background:#fbb"
| 55 || June 13 (2) || @ Padres || 3–4 || Rich Folkers (2–1) || Larry Christenson (7–3) || Butch Metzger (7) || 43,473 || 38–17
|- style="background:#bfb"
| 56 || June 15 || Giants || 10–2 || Steve Carlton (6–3) || Ed Halicki (4–10) || None || 28,564 || 39–17
|- style="background:#bfb"
| 57 || June 16 || Giants || 6–1 || Jim Kaat (6–2) || John Montefusco (7–6) || None || 28,966 || 40–17
|- style="background:#bfb"
| 58 || June 17 || Giants || 3–2 || Gene Garber (2–1) || Gary Lavelle (2–4) || None || 27,800 || 41–17
|- style="background:#bfb"
| 59 || June 18 || Reds || 6–5 || Jim Lonborg (9–3) || Jack Billingham (5–5) || Gene Garber (6) || 50,635 || 42–17
|- style="background:#fbb"
| 60 || June 19 || Reds || 3–4 || Gary Nolan (7–3) || Ron Reed (5–2) || Rawly Eastwick (8) || 36,808 || 42–18
|- style="background:#bfb"
| 61 || June 20 || Reds || 6–1 || Jim Kaat (7–2) || Don Gullett (6–3) || None || 38,669 || 43–18
|- style="background:#bfb"
| 62 || June 21 || Expos || 8–3 || Tom Underwood (4–1) || Dan Warthen (1–8) || None || 26,148 || 44–18
|- style="background:#fbb"
| 63 || June 22 || Expos || 3–8 || Clay Kirby (1–5) || Jim Lonborg (9–4) || Dale Murray (6) || 32,138 || 44–19
|- style="background:#bfb"
| 64 || June 23 || @ Reds || 4–2 || Ron Reed (6–2) || Pedro Borbón (0–1) || Gene Garber (7) || 35,266 || 45–19
|- style="background:#bfb"
| 65 || June 24 || @ Reds || 5–4 || Jim Kaat (8–2) || Gary Nolan (7–4) || Tug McGraw (5) || 34,053 || 46–19
|- style="background:#bfb"
| 66 || June 25 || Cardinals || 12–4 || Larry Christenson (8–3) || John Curtis (5–7) || None || 38,474 || 47–19
|- style="background:#fbb"
| 67 || June 26 || Cardinals || 2–3 (10) || Al Hrabosky (5–5) || Tug McGraw (4–4) || None || 41,052 || 47–20
|- style="background:#bfb"
| 68 || June 27 || Cardinals || 6–2 || Jim Lonborg (10–4) || Lynn McGlothen (6–7) || Ron Reed (1) || 31,489 || 48–20
|- style="background:#bfb"
| 69 || June 28 || @ Expos || 6–2 || Steve Carlton (7–3) || Steve Rogers (2–5) || None || 14,177 || 49–20
|- style="background:#bfb"
| 70 || June 29 || @ Expos || 2–1 || Gene Garber (3–1) || Dale Murray (0–6) || Ron Reed (2) || 10,939 || 50–20
|- style="background:#bbb"
| – || June 30 || @ Expos || colspan=6 | Postponed (rain); Makeup: September 24 as a traditional double-header
|-

|- style="background:#bbb"
| – || July 1 || @ Expos || colspan=6 | Postponed (rain); Makeup: September 26 as a traditional double-header
|- style="background:#fbb"
| 71 || July 2 || @ Pirates || 9–10 (10) || Ramón Hernández (2–1) || Gene Garber (3–2) || None || 39,328 || 50–21
|- style="background:#bfb"
| 72 || July 3 || @ Pirates || 3–2 || Tug McGraw (5–4) || Bob Moose (3–4) || None || 19,327 || 51–21
|- style="background:#bfb"
| 73 || July 4 (1) || @ Pirates || 10–5 || Steve Carlton (8–3) || Larry Demery (5–2) || Ron Reed (3) || see 2nd game || 52–21
|- style="background:#fbb"
| 74 || July 4 (2) || @ Pirates || 1–7 || Bruce Kison (7–4) || Jim Kaat (8–3) || None || 32,422 || 52–22
|- style="background:#fbb"
| 75 || July 5 || Dodgers || 0–6 || Burt Hooton (6–9) || Jim Lonborg (10–5) || None || 60,943 || 52–23
|- style="background:#fbb"
| 76 || July 6 || Dodgers || 1–5 || Doug Rau (7–6) || Larry Christenson (8–4) || None || 34,126 || 52–24
|- style="background:#fbb"
| 77 || July 7 || Dodgers || 5–6 || Don Sutton (8–8) || Ron Reed (6–3) || Charlie Hough (8) || 35,013 || 52–25
|- style="background:#bfb"
| 78 || July 9 || Padres || 4–3 || Tom Underwood (5–1) || Brent Strom (8–9) || Ron Reed (4) || 35,217 || 53–25
|- style="background:#bfb"
| 79 || July 10 (1) || Padres || 5–0 || Steve Carlton (9–3) || Alan Foster (3–6) || None || see 2nd game || 54–25
|- style="background:#bfb"
| 80 || July 10 (2) || Padres || 4–2 || Jim Lonborg (11–5) || Dan Spillner (2–9) || Ron Reed (5) || 47,101 || 55–25
|- style="background:#bfb"
| 81 || July 11 || Padres || 3–0 || Jim Kaat (9–3) || Dave Freisleben (6–5) || None || 46,807 || 56–25
|- style="background:#bbcaff;"
| – || July 13 ||colspan="7" |1976 Major League Baseball All-Star Game at Veterans Stadium in Philadelphia
|- style="background:#bfb"
| 82 || July 15 || @ Giants || 5–3 || Steve Carlton (10–3) || Mike Caldwell (0–6) || None || 5,759 || 57–25
|- style="background:#fbb"
| 83 || July 16 || @ Giants || 0–1 || Ed Halicki (9–11) || Jim Kaat (9–4) || None || 7,330 || 57–26
|- style="background:#fbb"
| 84 || July 17 || @ Giants || 1–4 || John Montefusco (8–8) || Tom Underwood (5–2) || None || 8,909 || 57–27
|- style="background:#bfb"
| 85 || July 18 || @ Dodgers || 2–1 || Ron Reed (7–3) || Charlie Hough (7–4) || None || 52,214 || 58–27
|- style="background:#bfb"
| 86 || July 19 || @ Dodgers || 5–3 || Gene Garber (4–2) || Burt Hooton (6–10) || Ron Reed (6) || 37,109 || 59–27
|- style="background:#fbb"
| 87 || July 20 || @ Padres || 0–3 || Randy Jones (17–4) || Steve Carlton (10–4) || None || 20,499 || 59–28
|- style="background:#bfb"
| 88 || July 21 || @ Padres || 5–1 || Jim Kaat (10–4) || Dave Freisleben (6–7) || Gene Garber (8) || 14,996 || 60–28
|- style="background:#bfb"
| 89 || July 22 || Pirates || 3–0 || Tom Underwood (6–2) || Bruce Kison (7–6) || Ron Reed (7) || 43,050 || 61–28
|- style="background:#bfb"
| 90 || July 23 || Pirates || 11–1 || Jim Lonborg (12–5) || Doc Medich (5–9) || None || 40,120 || 62–28
|- style="background:#fbb"
| 91 || July 24 (1) || Pirates || 5–8 || Jim Rooker (8–5) || Larry Christenson (8–5) || Dave Giusti (5) || see 2nd game || 62–29
|- style="background:#bfb"
| 92 || July 24 (2) || Pirates || 7–1 || Steve Carlton (11–4) || Bob Moose (3–5) || None || 57,723 || 63–29
|- style="background:#bfb"
| 93 || July 25 || Pirates || 13–7 || Ron Reed (8–3) || Dave Giusti (0–2) || None || 37,692 || 64–29
|- style="background:#bfb"
| 94 || July 26 || Mets || 4–1 || Larry Christenson (9–5) || Jon Matlack (10–5) || Tug McGraw (6) || 35,023 || 65–29
|- style="background:#fbb"
| 95 || July 27 || Mets || 1–4 || Bob Myrick (1–0) || Tom Underwood (6–3) || Skip Lockwood (10) || 35,376 || 65–30
|- style="background:#fbb"
| 96 || July 28 || Cubs || 2–5 (11) || Bruce Sutter (2–2) || Ron Reed (8–4) || None || 35,043 || 65–31
|- style="background:#bfb"
| 97 || July 29 || Cubs || 3–2 (11) || Gene Garber (5–2) || Darold Knowles (3–4) || None || 35,154 || 66–31
|- style="background:#fbb"
| 98 || July 30 || @ Mets || 2–3 || Jerry Koosman (12–7) || Jim Kaat (10–5) || None || 26,548 || 66–32
|- style="background:#bfb"
| 99 || July 31 || @ Mets || 2–1 || Larry Christenson (10–5) || Jon Matlack (10–6) || Tug McGraw (7) || 22,792 || 67–32
|-

|- style="background:#bfb"
| 100 || August 1 (1) || @ Mets || 7–6 (11) || Gene Garber (6–2) || Skip Lockwood (6–6) || None || see 2nd game || 68–32
|- style="background:#bfb"
| 101 || August 1 (2) || @ Mets || 2–0 || Wayne Twitchell (1–0) || Nino Espinosa (0–2) || Ron Schueler (3) || 34,413 || 69–32
|- style="background:#fbb"
| 102 || August 2 || @ Cubs || 2–4 || Bill Bonham (7–9) || Jim Lonborg (12–6) || Joe Coleman (3) || 9,525 || 69–33
|- style="background:#fbb"
| 103 || August 3 (1) || @ Cubs || 0–4 || Rick Reuschel (10–8) || Jim Kaat (10–6) || None || see 2nd game || 69–34
|- style="background:#bfb"
| 104 || August 3 (2) || @ Cubs || 8–5 || Steve Carlton (12–4) || Steve Stone (2–4) || Ron Reed (8) || 27,636 || 70–34
|- style="background:#bfb"
| 105 || August 4 || @ Cubs || 7–5 || Gene Garber (7–2) || Joe Coleman (2–10) || None || 16,070 || 71–34
|- style="background:#bfb"
| 106 || August 5 || @ Cardinals || 5–2 (8) || Wayne Twitchell (2–0) || Lynn McGlothen (9–11) || None || 15,569 || 72–34
|- style="background:#fbb"
| 107 || August 6 || @ Cardinals || 2–6 || John Denny (6–5) || Jim Lonborg (12–7) || Al Hrabosky (11) || 25,339 || 72–35
|- style="background:#fbb"
| 108 || August 7 || @ Cardinals || 1–4 || Pete Falcone (8–11) || Jim Kaat (10–7) || Al Hrabosky (12) || 32,105 || 72–36
|- style="background:#bfb"
| 109 || August 8 || @ Cardinals || 3–2 || Steve Carlton (13–4) || Bill Greif (2–7) || Ron Reed (9) || 27,448 || 73–36
|- style="background:#fbb"
| 110 || August 10 || Braves || 1–2 || Phil Niekro (12–8) || Larry Christenson (10–6) || Adrian Devine (2) || 30,323 || 73–37
|- style="background:#bfb"
| 111 || August 11 || Braves || 4–1 || Tom Underwood (7–3) || Carl Morton (2–9) || Ron Reed (10) || 30,247 || 74–37
|- style="background:#fbb"
| 112 || August 12 || Braves || 3–4 || Frank LaCorte (1–6) || Jim Lonborg (12–8) || Adrian Devine (3) || 30,415 || 74–38
|- style="background:#fbb"
| 113 || August 13 || Giants || 0–3 || John Montefusco (13–9) || Jim Kaat (10–8) || None || 32,642 || 74–39
|- style="background:#bfb"
| 114 || August 14 || Giants || 13–2 || Steve Carlton (14–4) || Jim Barr (10–9) || None || 38,368 || 75–39
|- style="background:#fbb"
| 115 || August 15 || Giants || 5–9 || Randy Moffitt (5–4) || Gene Garber (7–3) || None || 28,316 || 75–40
|- style="background:#bfb"
| 116 || August 17 || Expos || 11–3 || Tom Underwood (8–3) || Steve Rogers (5–11) || None || 27,188 || 76–40
|- style="background:#bfb"
| 117 || August 18 || Expos || 5–4 || Jim Lonborg (13–8) || Don Stanhouse (8–7) || Ron Reed (11) || 28,483 || 77–40
|- style="background:#bfb"
| 118 || August 19 || Astros || 7–1 || Steve Carlton (15–4) || Joaquín Andújar (6–9) || None || 35,605 || 78–40
|- style="background:#fbb"
| 119 || August 20 || Astros || 3–8 || Dan Larson (3–4) || Wayne Twitchell (2–1) || None || 36,049 || 78–41
|- style="background:#bfb"
| 120 || August 21 || Astros || 7–4 || Jim Kaat (11–8) || J. R. Richard (14–13) || Ron Reed (12) || 37,756 || 79–41
|- style="background:#bfb"
| 121 || August 22 || Astros || 5–1 || Tom Underwood (9–3) || Larry Dierker (12–12) || None || 43,513 || 80–41
|- style="background:#bfb"
| 122 || August 23 || @ Braves || 4–2 || Jim Lonborg (14–8) || Dick Ruthven (13–12) || Tug McGraw (8) || 11,600 || 81–41
|- style="background:#bfb"
| 123 || August 24 || @ Braves || 14–3 || Steve Carlton (16–4) || Andy Messersmith (11–11) || None || 25,156 || 82–41
|- style="background:#fbb"
| 124 || August 25 || @ Braves || 1–5 || Phil Niekro (14–9) || Larry Christenson (10–7) || None || 7,514 || 82–42
|- style="background:#bfb"
| 125 || August 26 || @ Reds || 5–4 (13) || Tug McGraw (6–4) || Rawly Eastwick (8–4) || None || 38,094 || 83–42
|- style="background:#fbb"
| 126 || August 27 || @ Reds || 1–4 || Fred Norman (12–4) || Tom Underwood (9–4) || Pedro Borbón (5) || 49,821 || 83–43
|- style="background:#fbb"
| 127 || August 28 || @ Reds || 7–8 || Rawly Eastwick (9–4) || Tug McGraw (6–5) || None || 51,091 || 83–44
|- style="background:#fbb"
| 128 || August 29 || @ Reds || 5–6 (15) || Santo Alcalá (11–3) || Jim Kaat (11–9) || None || 51,376 || 83–45
|- style="background:#fbb"
| 129 || August 30 || @ Astros || 1–3 || Dan Larson (4–5) || Larry Christenson (10–8) || None || 5,437 || 83–46
|- style="background:#fbb"
| 130 || August 31 || @ Astros || 2–3 || J. R. Richard (16–13) || Tug McGraw (6–6) || None || 6,881 || 83–47
|-

|- style="background:#fbb"
| 131 || September 1 || @ Astros || 0–1 || Bo McLaughlin (3–2) || Jim Kaat (11–10) || None || 6,395 || 83–48
|- style="background:#fbb"
| 132 || September 3 || @ Mets || 0–1 || Tom Seaver (11–10) || Steve Carlton (16–5) || None || 21,174 || 83–49
|- style="background:#fbb"
| 133 || September 4 || @ Mets || 3–7 || Nino Espinosa (3–3) || Jim Lonborg (14–9) || Skip Lockwood (15) || 16,022 || 83–50
|- style="background:#bfb"
| 134 || September 5 || @ Mets || 3–1 || Larry Christenson (11–8) || Mickey Lolich (7–12) || Ron Reed (13) || 20,701 || 84–50
|- style="background:#fbb"
| 135 || September 6 (1) || @ Pirates || 2–6 || Bruce Kison (12–8) || Jim Kaat (11–11) || None || see 2nd game || 84–51
|- style="background:#fbb"
| 136 || September 6 (2) || @ Pirates || 1–5 || Larry Demery (10–4) || Tom Underwood (9–5) || None || 41,703 || 84–52
|- style="background:#fbb"
| 137 || September 8 || @ Pirates || 1–6 || Jim Rooker (13–7) || Steve Carlton (16–6) || None || 30,976 || 84–53
|- style="background:#bfb"
| 138 || September 9 || Cubs || 4–2 || Jim Lonborg (15–9) || Bill Bonham (8–11) || None || 27,194 || 85–53
|- style="background:#fbb"
| 139 || September 10 || Cubs || 2–3 || Rick Reuschel (12–10) || Jim Kaat (11–12) || None || 30,121 || 85–54
|- style="background:#fbb"
| 140 || September 11 || Cubs || 1–4 (12) || Bruce Sutter (5–3) || Ron Reed (8–5) || Joe Coleman (4) || 37,668 || 85–55
|- style="background:#bfb"
| 141 || September 12 || Cubs || 8–0 || Larry Christenson (12–8) || Steve Renko (7–9) || Tug McGraw (9) || 34,469 || 86–55
|- style="background:#bfb"
| 142 || September 13 || Expos || 7–2 || Steve Carlton (17–6) || Dennis Blair (0–1) || Gene Garber (9) || 20,114 || 87–55
|- style="background:#bfb"
| 143 || September 14 || Expos || 3–2 || Jim Lonborg (16–9) || Woodie Fryman (12–11) || Ron Reed (14) || 23,812 || 88–55
|- style="background:#fbb"
| 144 || September 15 || Pirates || 2–7 || John Candelaria (15–6) || Jim Kaat (11–13) || None || 45,010 || 88–56
|- style="background:#fbb"
| 145 || September 16 || Pirates || 6–7 || Kent Tekulve (5–1) || Ron Reed (8–6) || None || 35,806 || 88–57
|- style="background:#fbb"
| 146 || September 17 || @ Cubs || 3–4 (12) || Bruce Sutter (6–3) || Ron Reed (8–7) || None || 3,631 || 88–58
|- style="background:#bfb"
| 147 || September 18 || @ Cubs || 4–1 || Steve Carlton (18–6) || Rick Reuschel (13–11) || None || 15,938 || 89–58
|- style="background:#fbb"
| 148 || September 19 || @ Cubs || 0–1 || Ray Burris (14–13) || Jim Lonborg (16–10) || None || 17,764 || 89–59
|- style="background:#bfb"
| 149 || September 21 || Cardinals || 5–1 || Tom Underwood (10–5) || John Denny (10–8) || Tug McGraw (10) || 20,261 || 90–59
|- style="background:#bfb"
| 150 || September 22 || Cardinals || 9–4 || Gene Garber (8–3) || Tom Walker (1–2) || None || 27,423 || 91–59
|- style="background:#bfb"
| 151 || September 23 || Cardinals || 7–3 || Steve Carlton (19–6) || Eric Rasmussen (5–12) || None || 29,018 || 92–59
|- style="background:#bfb"
| 152 || September 24 (1) || @ Expos || 9–3 || Larry Christenson (13–8) || Steve Rogers (6–17) || Gene Garber (10) || see 2nd game || 93–59
|- style="background:#fbb"
| 153 || September 24 (2) || @ Expos || 2–3 || Don Stanhouse (9–11) || Jim Kaat (11–14) || None || 4,510 || 93–60
|- style="background:#bfb"
| 154 || September 25 || @ Expos || 6–5 || Wayne Twitchell (3–1) || Woodie Fryman (13–12) || Gene Garber (11) || 5,096 || 94–60
|- style="background:#bfb"
| 155 || September 26 (1) || @ Expos || 4–1 || Jim Lonborg (17–10) || Dan Warthen (2–9) || None || see 2nd game || 95–60
|- style="background:#bfb"
| 156 || September 26 (2) || @ Expos || 2–1 (7) || Ron Schueler (1–0) || Dennis Blair (0–2) || None || 14,166 || 96–60
|- style="background:#bfb"
| 157 || September 27 || @ Cardinals || 9–1 || Jim Kaat (12–14) || Pete Falcone (12–15) || Randy Lerch (1) || 6,199 || 97–60
|- style="background:#fbb"
| 158 || September 28 || @ Cardinals || 3–5 || Eric Rasmussen (6–12) || Steve Carlton (19–7) || None || 5,793 || 97–61
|- style="background:#bfb"
| 159 || September 29 || @ Cardinals || 6–5 || Tug McGraw (7–6) || John Curtis (6–11) || Wayne Twitchell (1) || 5,992 || 98–61
|-

|- style="background:#bfb"
| 160 || October 1 || Mets || 2–1 || Gene Garber (9–3) || Jerry Koosman (21–10) || None || 23,084 || 99–61
|- style="background:#bfb"
| 161 || October 2 || Mets || 7–4 || Jim Lonborg (18–10) || Jon Matlack (17–10) || Tug McGraw (11) || 47,095 || 100–61
|- style="background:#bfb"
| 162 || October 3 || Mets || 2–1 || Steve Carlton (20–7) || Craig Swan (6–9) || None || 25,632 || 101–61
|-

 Roster 

 Player stats 

 Batting 

 Starters by position 
Note: Pos = Position; G = Games played; AB = At bats; H = Hits; Avg. = Batting average; HR = Home runs; RBI = Runs batted in

 Other batters 
Note: G = Games played; AB = At bats; H = Hits; Avg. = Batting average; HR = Home runs; RBI = Runs batted in

 Pitching 

 Starting pitchers 
Note: G = Games pitched; IP = Innings pitched; W = Wins; L = Losses; ERA = Earned run average; SO = Strikeouts

 Relief pitchers 
Note: G = Games pitched; W = Wins; L = Losses; SV = Saves; ERA = Earned run average; SO = Strikeouts

 1976 National League Championship Series 

 Game 1 
October 9, Veterans Stadium

 Game 2 
October 10, Veterans Stadium

 Game 3 
October 12, Riverfront Stadium

Postseason game log

|- style="background:#fbb"
| 1 || October 9 || Reds || 3–6 || Don Gullett (1–0) || Steve Carlton (0–1) || None || 62,640 || 0–1
|- style="background:#fbb"
| 2 || October 10 || Reds || 2–6 || Pat Zachry (1–0) || Jim Lonborg (0–1) || Pedro Borbón (1) || 62,651 || 0–2
|- style="background:#fbb"
| 3 || October 12 || @ Reds || 6–7 || Rawly Eastwick (1–0) || Gene Garber' (0–1) || None'' || 55,047 || 0–3
|-

Farm system

Notes

References 
Baseball Reference: 1976 Philadelphia Phillies

External links 

Philadelphia Phillies seasons
Philadelphia Phillies season
National League East champion seasons
Philadelph